This is a complete list of the operas of the Italian-born composer Luigi Cherubini (1760–1842) who spent much of his working life in France.

In terms of genre, Cherubini's output included 11 opere serie and 10 opéras comiques, as well as three intermezzi, three tragédies lyriques, two opere buffe, and one each of the following: comédie héroïque, comédie lyrique, comédie mêlée d'ariettes, drame lyrique, dramma lirico, opéra bouffon, and opéra-ballet.

List of operas

References
Notes

Sources
Willis, Stephen C (1992), "Cherubini, Luigi" in The New Grove Dictionary of Opera, ed. Stanley Sadie (London) 
Some of the information in this article is taken from the related Dutch Wikipedia article.

Lists of operas by composer
 
Lists of compositions by composer